The 1st South American Under-23 Championships in Athletics were held
in Barquisimeto, Venezuela, at the Polideportivo Máximo Viloria on
June 26–27, 2004.

Participation

A total of 310 athletes from 13 countries were announced to participate:

Argentina (29),  Bolivia (5), Brazil (84), Chile (43), Colombia (36), Ecuador (24),
Guyana (4), Panamá (2), Paraguay (3), Perú (5), Surinam (2), Uruguay (6),
Venezuela (68).  Athletes from the Dominican Republic (4), from the Netherlands
Antilles (4), and from Trinidad and Tobago (11) were invited as guest
athletes in accordance with the regulations of CONSUDATLE.  In addition, one source also lists results from 4 athletes representing Saint Kitts and Nevis.

Medal summary

Medal winners are published.
Detailed results can be found on the CACAC website, and on the Tilastopaja website,

Men

Women

* Keisa Monterola from Venezuela was then only 16 years old and could not
officially participate at the championships.  Out of competition, she
cleared 3.80m in the first attempt, which would have placed her in the
second place of the competition.

** Some sources list Jéssica Quispe from Perú to finish second in 4:27.68 in
the 1500m women's event. Just as pole vaulter Keisa Monterola, she might
have started out of competition because of her age (she was then only 17 years old).

Medal table (unofficial)

Team trophies

The final scoring per country for the team trophy was published.

Overall

References

External links
ConSudAtle U-23 winners 2004

South American Under-23 Championships in Athletics
2004 in Venezuelan sport
South American U23 Championships
International athletics competitions hosted by Venezuela
Ath
2004 in youth sport
June 2004 sports events in South America